Marh Balochan railway station  is located in Marh Balochan village, Nankana Sahib district of Punjab province, Pakistan.

See also
 List of railway stations in Pakistan
 Pakistan Railways

References

External links

Railway stations in Nankana Sahib District
Railway stations on Khanewal–Wazirabad Line